Gayathripuzha River is one of the main tributaries of the Bharathapuzha River, the second-longest river in Kerala, south India. It originates from Anamala hills, passes through Kollengode, Nenmara (Nemmara), Alathur, Padur and Pazhayannur before joining the Bharathapuzha at Mayannur. It is the second largest tributary of Bharathapuzha, by both length and discharge. It flows mainly through Palakkad district, except the last few kilometres. The river is non-perennial like its parent river, and is also prone of sand mining. There is a dam built across this river at Cherakkuzhy near Pazhayannur.

Tributaries of Gayathripuzha
Mangalam river
Ayalurpuzha
Vandazhippuzha
Meenkarappuzha
Chulliyar

External links 

Rivers of Palakkad district
Rivers of Thrissur district
Bharathappuzha